KSSJ may refer to:

 KSSJ-LD, a low-power television station (channel 33, virtual 47) licensed to serve San Antonio, Texas, United States
 KKDO, a radio station (94.7 FM) licensed to serve Fair Oaks, California, United States, which held the call sign KSSJ from 1997 to 2010